Simon Désiré Sylvanus Deli (born 27 October 1991) is an Ivorian professional footballer who plays as a centre back for Turkish club İstanbulspor on loan from Adana Demirspor, and the Ivory Coast national team.

Club career

Sparta Prague and loans
Deli signed for the Czech First League side Sparta Prague in 2012, but made no league appearances for the club. He gained competitive experience in the Czech league by being loaned out to other Czech First League clubs, České Budějovice and Příbram.

Slavia Prague
Deli moved from Sparta Prague to their rivals Slavia Prague, who were then struggling to avoid relegation, in January 2015. He quickly established himself in Slavia, playing in 66 out of their 74 league matches in his first three seasons. He won the 2016–17 Czech First League title with Slavia Prague, and was the runner-up for the Best Defender of the Year award. In June 2017, he extended his contract until June 2020.

Club Brugge
Deli joined Club Brugge KV on 10 July 2019, on a three-year contract until 2022.

On 1 February 2021, Deli returned former club Slavia Prague on a loan deal until the end of the season.

Adana Demirspor
Deli moved to Süper Lig club Adana Demirspor in August 2021, having agreed a three-year contract.

International career
Deli made his debut in the Ivory Coast national team in 2015, and went on to represent his country on the 2017 Africa Cup of Nations.

Career statistics

Club

International

Honours
Slavia Prague
Czech First League: 2016–17, 2018–19, 2020–21
Czech Cup: 2017–18, 2018–19, 2020–21

Club Brugge
Belgian First Division A: 2019–20

References

External links
 
 

1991 births
Living people
Footballers from Abidjan
Association football defenders
Ivorian footballers
Ivory Coast international footballers
2017 Africa Cup of Nations players
Czech First League players
Czech National Football League players
Belgian Pro League players
SK Dynamo České Budějovice players
1. FK Příbram players
SK Slavia Prague players
Club Brugge KV players
Adana Demirspor footballers
İstanbulspor footballers
Ivorian expatriate footballers
Ivorian expatriate sportspeople in the Czech Republic
Expatriate footballers in the Czech Republic
Ivorian expatriate sportspeople in Belgium
Expatriate footballers in Belgium
Ivorian expatriate sportspeople in Turkey
Expatriate footballers in Turkey
2021 Africa Cup of Nations players